The Venezuelan Ministry of Education (Spanish: Ministerio del Poder Popular para la Educación) is the federal-level department responsible for organising the education system of Venezuela. In 2001 it was the Ministry of Education, Sport and Culture, with responsibility for Culture and Sport being assigned to separate ministries on 14 February 2005 and 6 January 2007.

Administration 
The Ministry itself has four sub-departments, each overseeing different areas of education. They are the Department of Primary and Secondary Education, the Department of Higher Education and Research, the Department of Special Programs in Education, and the Department of Administration and Service. The Ministry maintains strict control over the curriculum, meaning it is almost identical at every level across the country in all institutions; in 2009, even more curriculum control was given to a council that is run as part of the United Socialist Party of Venezuela, which prompted protests.

There are two education laws in the country, the 1940 Ley de Educación and the 1980 Ley Orgánica de Educación. In 1969 the government also adopted decrees 120 and 136, with plans to reform the general education curriculum. Since the entrance of the Chávez government, early-education reform took place to introduce "Bolivarian schools" that teach students up to the age of 14 in line with the principles of Bolivarianism and emphasize serving the country.

There has been debate in the university community over curriculum reforms at this level; though university management staff agree that new laws may be needed to address deficits in teaching 21st-century information, they fear that any attempts to push reform through a Chavist government will take away what little autonomy they have from the powers many universities in the country reject.

Since 1976, the Ministry has run the country's Open University to provide distance learning for adults.

Ministers 
The current Education Minister is Yelitze Santaella.

Financing
The Ministry is in charge of all education funding in Venezuela from a budget provided entirely by the government, and subsequently how it is spent. This budget is typically about 15% of the entire government budget, and of this, higher education has the largest share, usually about a third of the whole Education budget.

Pre-school and primary education 
State-funded preschools are free to attend, but are underfunded; private alternatives have taken over at this level of education. As preschool is not compulsory in Venezuela, many of those who do attend are enrolled at the private schools and as such are from wealthier backgrounds. Primary schools are compulsory, and see good attendance, though more in urban areas than in rural. No matter their public or private status, all schools in Venezuela are under the oversight of the Ministry.

Secondary education 
Private education is particularly popular at the secondary education level. The Bolivarian missions launched in 2003 were also seen as a success for providing outreach to improve literacy and university opportunities in rural areas.

Higher education 
Universities have a certain level of autonomy and are allowed to receive funds from other sources, including private donations and from their research (e.g. patents) and other marketable pursuits, as long as this does not exceed the funding received from the Ministry. The ultimate responsibility for the management of the university also belongs to the Ministry, so universities cannot be independent from government control and the Minister for Education is able to take charge of all university activities if it deems necessary, including curriculum, research, policy, and the university management itself.

Higher education facilities and individual students in Venezuela may also receive recurrent funding from the private sector for the establishment of scholarships or fellowships.

In the 1970s, a program called the Gran Mariscal de Ayacucho Foundation (Fundayacucho) was started by the government to encourage external training in subjects for necessary vocations, sending many students to Spain, the United States, and the United Kingdom. However, while tuition was paid for by the government at the foreign institution, no employment support was given in Venezuela, resulting in many of the students returning or staying in the countries they had been sent to. This also led to a shortage of trained professionals in the areas that were planned to improve the country. In the 21st century, Fundayacucho has instead become a government loan provider for students, but still provides loan forgiveness if students maintain a certain GPA.

In 2012, the Ministry of Higher Education introduced currency controls on students, only allowing university students with approved permission to seek education or training abroad in certain specific degrees to exchange currency. None of these degree pathways are humanities or social sciences, and biology is not included, either.

Research 
The standard of research in Venezuela has been described as "generally weak", with the system said to "not foster a research environment" at all.

Institutions at large cannot maintain research projects due to a lack of modern facilities, and those who leave the country for education tend to remain abroad to conduct research. Academics who used to work in Venezuela have also left the country in a brain drain that has particularly affected the sciences because of the lack of funding given in Venezuela.

The government also sponsors CONICIT (National Science Council), which provides highly competitive funding for any kind of research or further training and education.

According to the World Education Review, in 2013 there were more Venezuelan scientists working in the US alone than in Venezuela, by 150%.

See also

Education in Venezuela

References

External links
  Sitio oficial del Ministerio del Poder Popular para la Educación

Education in Venezuela
Education
Venezuela